Coverage is the third studio album by American singer Mandy Moore. It was released on October 21, 2003, by Epic Records. It is a cover album with 12 covers of 1970s and 1980s songs on which Moore collaborated with producer and songwriter John Fields. Coverage was the first studio album by Moore in two years, following her self-titled second studio album Mandy Moore (2001), and was preceded by its lead single "Have a Little Faith in Me", which reached number 39 on Billboard’s Mainstream Top 40.

The album received generally positive reviews from music critics when it was released.

Background

On June 19, 2001, Moore released her self-titled album, Mandy Moore, which had more adult and provocative themes along with the lead single "In My Pocket", but Moore began to get tired of her teen pop style and continuing to go in the direction of and being compared to Christina Aguilera, Jessica Simpson and Britney Spears. In an interview, she said her next album would be more mature than her last, and that she felt more comfortable making it. On the red carpet of the 2003 MTV Video Music Awards, she revealed that her then-upcoming album was a cover album titled Coverage that had covers of 1970s and 1980s songs.

Moore's cover of "I Feel the Earth Move" later appeared on the compilation album Love Rocks from LBGT rights supporters.

Composition
The album consists of various covers of 1970s and 1980s songs. The first single, "Have a Little Faith in Me", was written and originally recorded by John Hiatt from his eighth album Bring the Family (1987). The second single, "Drop the Pilot", was written and originally recorded by Joan Armatrading as the first single from her eighth album The Key (1983). The third single, "Senses Working Overtime", was originally recorded by the English band XTC in 1982.

"The Whole of the Moon" was originally recorded by The Waterboys and was released in 1985. "Can We Still Be Friends" was written and originally recorded by Todd Rundgren. Its lyrics describe a strained and ill-fated relationship. "I Feel the Earth Move" was originally written and recorded by Carole King. "Mona Lisas and Mad Hatters" was originally recorded by Elton John for his fifth album Honky Château (1972). It was co-written by John with Bernie Taupin and is his take on New York City after hearing a gun go off near his hotel window during his first visit to the city.  "Moonshadow" was written and originally recorded by Cat Stevens for his fifth album Teaser and the Firecat (1971). "One Way or Another" was originally recorded by American new wave band Blondie for the band's third album Parallel Lines (1978) and reached No. 24 on the Billboard Hot 100. The song is based on an ex-boyfriend of lead singer Debbie Harry who stalked her after their break-up. "Breaking Us in Two" was written and originally recorded by Joe Jackson for his fifth album Night and Day (1982). "Anticipation" was written and originally recorded by Carly Simon as the title track from her second album of the same name (1971). The song was used in commercials for Heinz Ketchup from the late 1970s into the 1980s. "Help Me" was written, produced and originally recorded by Joni Mitchell for her sixth album Court and Spark (1974). The song was recorded with Tom Scott's L.A. Express.

Critical reception

The album received generally favorable reviews from music critics. Stephen Thomas Erlewine of AllMusic remarked, "With this record, she leaves dance-pop behind and heads toward mature pop ... positioning herself as a pop/rock singer by covering classic singer/songwriters ... [W]hile Coverage isn't always successful, it is always admirable and likeable, and certainly puts Moore on the right path for an interesting, successful career."

Commercial performance
In the United States, Coverage debuted at number 14 on the Billboard 200 chart with 53,000 first week sales. It was Moore's highest peak position on the chart. The album spent a total of thirteen weeks on the Billboard 200 chart, it was her third longest charting album on the chart. According to Nielsen SoundScan, Coverage had sold 315,000 copies in the United States, it was Moore's fourth highest selling album in the US.

In Australia, Coverage debuted at number 97 on the ARIA Albums chart with modest sales, It was Moore's lowest charting album in the country.

Track listing
All songs produced by John Fields.

Personnel
Jim Anton – bass
Kevin Augunas – bass (electric), engineer
Tommy Barbarella – synthesizer, piano, organ (Hammond), piano (electric)
Michael Bland – drums
Monika Blunder – make-up
D.J. Bonebrake – vibraphone
Ken Chastain – bass, percussion, tambourine
Julius Collins – vocals
Colleen Conway – hair stylist
Dorian Crozier – percussion, drums, engineer
Andy Sturmer - Engineer, Vocals, Drums 
Evan Dando – guitar (acoustic)
Christina Ehrlich – stylist
John Fields – bass, guitar, guitar (baritone), guitar (electric), French horn, keyboards, vocals, producer, engineer, string arrangements, mixing, effects
Dirk Freymuth – guitar
Loren Gold – piano
Billy Hawn – percussion
Eric Heywood – pedal steel
Kenny Holmen – flute, sax (tenor)
Dave Jensen – trumpet
Kathy Jensen – sax (baritone)
Ameena Maria Khawaja – cello
Dan Leffler – mixing engineer
Noah Levy – drums
Matt Mahaffey – piano, drums, engineer, Chamberlin, effects, Minimoog
George Scot McKelvey – guitar
Mandy Moore – main vocals
Josh Myers – string arrangements
Danielle Nesmith – violin
Jason Orris – engineer
Julian Peploe – art direction, design
Mike Ruekberg – guitar (acoustic)
Phil Solem – guitar (acoustic), guitar, mandolin, vocals
Audrey Solomon – violin
Steve Strand – trumpet
Chris Testa – engineer
Danny Wilde – vocals
Dan Wilson – vocals
Jordon Zadorozny – guitar

Deluxe edition bonus DVD
 Exclusive interview footage and B-roll
 Track-by-track discussion of songs on album
 "Have a Little Faith in Me" music video
 Different cover art

Charts

References

External links
 Mandy Moore on Oprah
 

Mandy Moore albums
2003 albums
Covers albums
Epic Records albums
Albums produced by John Fields (record producer)